This is a list of active police tactical units.

Definition

Police tactical units are specialized units of a police force tasked with resolving high risk / critical incidents, including:
 high risk armed offender / suspect searches / apprehensions including arrest warrants 
 high risk search warrants involving an armed / dangerous offender / suspect 
 siege / barricade incidents involving an armed offender / suspect 
 domestic counter-terrorism incidents such as hostage rescue and / or armed intervention (including units that may be granted authority for overseas operations)

In the United States, police tactical units are known by the generic term Special Weapons And Tactics (SWAT) team (other countries have adopted this term). In Australia, the term police tactical group is used for police tactical units. The European Union uses the term special intervention unit for national counter terrorist police tactical units.

For military special forces / special operations forces, see list of military special forces units.

Afghanistan
Interior Ministry
 Afghan National Civil Order Police Special Support Battalion
 General Command of Police Special Units (GCPSU)
 Crisis Response Unit 222 (CRU 222)
 Commando Force 333 (CF 333)
 Afghan Territorial Force 444  (ATF 444)

Albania
 RENEA
 Shqiponjat
 FNSH

Algeria
Sûreté Nationale
 Police Special Operations Group
 Research and Intervention Brigade (BRI)

Gendarmerie Nationale
Special Intervention Detachment (DSI)

Argentina
Argentine Federal Police
 Federal Special Operations Group (GEOF)
 Grupo Especial Uno "GE-1" (Special Group One)

 Argentine National Gendarmerie
Equipo Antiterrorista (Anti-Terrorist Team)
 Scorpion Group - Formerly the Escuadrón Especial de la Gendarmería Nacional
Sección Operaciones Especiales de Monte de Gendarmería Nacional "Groupe Monte" ('National Gendarmarie Jungle Special Operations Section')
Unidad Especial de Lucha Contra Narcotraficante (UELCON)

 Local and other units
 Hawk Special Operations Brigade (BEOH) - Buenos Aires Provincial Police
 Special Operations Troops Company (TOE) - Santa Fe Provincial Police
Equipo Táctico Especial Recomendado (E.T.E.R.) - Córdoba Provincial Police
 Albatross Group - Argentine Naval Prefecture
Grupo de Respuesta Imediata de Alto Riesgo (GRIAR; 'Immediate High Risk Response Group') - Argentine Naval Prefecture

Armenia
 National Security Service
 Alpha Group
 Police of Armenia
 Police tactical unit

Australia

Australian Federal Police
 Specialist Response Group (SRG)

New South Wales Police Force
 Tactical Operations Unit (TOU)
 Tactical Operations Regional Support (TORS)
Public Order and Riot Squad (PORS) 

Northern Territory Police
 Territory Response Group (TRG)

Queensland Police
 Special Emergency Response Team (SERT)

South Australia Police
 Special Tasks and Rescue Group (STAR)

Tasmania Police
 Special Operations Group (SOG)

Victoria Police
 Special Operations Group (SOG)
 Critical Incident Response Team (CIRT)

Western Australia Police
 Tactical Response Group (TRG)

 New South Wales Corrective Services
 Security Operations Group (SOG)

 Western Australia Department of Corrective Services
Special Operations Group (SOG)

Austria
Federal Ministry of the Interior
EKO Cobra - Special operations and counterterrorism unit

Federal Police

WEGA - SWAT team

Justizwache (Penitentiary police)

Justizwache Einsatzgruppe (JEG) - Penitentiary police SWAT team

Azerbaijan
Ministry of Internal Affairs
 OPON
 Rapid Police Unit

Bahamas
Royal Bahamas Police Force
 Security and Intelligence Branch

Bangladesh
Rapid Action Battalion
Counter Terrorism and Transnational Crime
 Dhaka Metropolitan Police SWAT
 Crisis Response Team
 Quick Response Team
 Anti Terrorism Unit

Belarus
Militsiya
 Almaz Special Anti-Terrorism Unit (SPBT Almaz)
 OMON (AMAP) Special Purpose Police Unit

Belgium
Federal police
 Directie van de speciale eenheden/Direction des unités spéciales (DSU; 'Directorate of the Special Units')

Bolivia
Bolivian Police Force
Unidad Tactica de Operaciones Policiales (UTOP) - Tactical Response Unit
Fuerza especial de lucha contra el narcotráfico (FELCN) - Bolivian anti-narcotics force
Fuerza especial de lucha contra el crimen (FELCC) - Bolivian anti-criminal force

Bosnia and Herzegovina
Bosnian Police Force
 State Investigation and Protection Agency (SIPA)
 Special Support Unit
 Bosnian Special Police Units
 Special Police Unit

Other units
 MUP FBiH Federal Counter-terrorism branches - Federation of Bosnia and Herzegovina Police
 MUP RS Counter-terrorism branches - Republika Srpska Police

Bulgaria
Ministry of Interior

SOBT

Bulgarian Gendarmerie
 Counter-Terrorist Squads

Brazil

Federal Police Department
Comando de Operações Táticas (COT) - is a specialized counter terrorism unit with headquarters in Brasília
Grupos de Pronta Intervenção (GPI) - are SWAT like tactical units that supports local operations. Each state has its own G.P.I. unit

Polícia Militar

BOE/BOPE (Batalhão de Operações Especiais) units:
Special Operations Battalion (PMAC) - in Acre
Special Operations Battalion (PMDF) - in the Federal District
Specials Battalion Operations (PMMT) - in the state of Mato Grosso
Special Operations Battalion (PMPR) - the state of Paraná
Special Operations Battalion (PMPI) - the state of Piauí
Special Police Operations Battalion (PMAL) - the state of Alagoas
Special Police Operations Battalion (PMRR) - in the state of Roraima
Special Police Operations Battalion (PMSC) - the state of Santa Catarina
Special Police Operations Battalion (PMERJ) - in the state of Rio de Janeiro
Special Police Operations Battalion (PMRN) - in Rio Grande do Norte state
Special Police Operations Battalion (PMBA) - the state of Bahia
Special Police Operations Battalion (PMRS) - in Rio Grande do Sul state
Special Police Operations Battalion (PMAP) - in Amapá state
Special Police Operations Battalion (PMMG) - is a GATE type unit of the Military Police of Minas Gerais State
Tobias de Aguiar Ostensive Patrols (ROTA) - An elite ostensive patrol battalion and quick reaction force of the Military Police of São Paulo State.
Group of Special Tactical Actions (GATE) - Police tactical unit within Military Police of São Paulo State tasked with hostage rescue operations.
Commandos and Special Operations (COE) - A special forces unit of the Military Police of São Paulo State, tasked with operations against violent crime in complex environments such as favelas, forest regions and at sea. Both GATE and COE are part of the 4th Shock Police Battalion.

Policia Civil

Grupo Tático 3 (GT3) - in the state of Goiás
Grupo Especial de Reação (GER) - is tactical unit similar to GOE operating in the state of São Paulo
Grupo de Operações Especiais (GOE) - is the elite arm of the Civil Police of the state of São Paulo
Centro de Operações Policiais Especiais (COPE) - is a specialized division within the civil police of Paraná state
Tático Integrado de Grupos de Repressão Especial (TIGRE) - is a SWAT type tactical unit that specializes in hostage rescue operations in the state of Paraná
Coordenadoria de Recursos Especiais (CORE) - is a paramilitary police unit within the Civil Police of Rio de Janeiro State
Divisão de Operações especiais (DOE) - is a special tactics unit based in Federal District
Grupo de Operações Especiais (GOE) - is the GOE unit of the state of Pernambuco

Brunei
Royal Brunei Police Force
 Special Operations Squad (SOS)

Canada
Federal units
 Royal Canadian Mounted Police (RCMP)
 Emergency Response Team (ERT)

 Parliamentary Protective Service (PPS) - Mobile Response Team
 Correctional Service of Canada (CSC)
 Institutional Emergency Response Team (IERT)
 Institutional Crisis Intervention Team (ICIT)
Provincial and Municipal units

 Abbotsford Police Department - Emergency Response Team
Barrie Police Service - Tactical Support Unit (TSU)
Bathurst Police Force - Emergency Response Team (ERT)
 Brandon Police Service - Tactical Response Unit (TRU)
 Brantford Police Service - Emergency Response Team (ERT)
 Brockville Police Service - Emergency Response Team (ERT)
 Calgary Police Service - Tactical Unit
Cape Breton Regional Police Service - Emergency Response Team (ERT)
Service de police de la MRC des Collines-de-l'Outaouais - Unité spéciale d’intervention
Cornwall Police Service - Cornwall Emergency Response Team (CERT)
Durham Regional Police Service - Tactical Support Unit
 Edmonton Police Service - Tactical Unit
Estevan Police Service - Containment / Warrant Entry Team (CWET)
Service de police de la Ville de Gatineau - Groupe d’intervention
Greater Sudbury Police Service - Tactical Unit
Guelph Police Service - Tactics and Rescue Unit
Halifax Regional Police - Emergency Response Team (ERT)
 Halton Regional Police Service - Tactical Rescue Unit (TRU)
Kingston Police - Emergency Response Unit
Service de police de la Ville de Laval - Groupe d’intervention
London Police Service - Emergency Response Unit (ERU)
Service de police de l'agglomération de Longueuil - Groupe d’intervention
Miramichi Police Force - Tactical High Risk Entry and Arrest Team (THREAT)
 Service de Police de la Ville de Montreal - Groupe Tactique d’intervention
Niagara Regional Police Service - Emergency Task Unit (ETU)
 Ontario Provincial Police
 Tactics and Rescue Unit (TRU)
 Emergency Response Team (ERT)
 Ottawa Police Service - Tactical Unit
Peel Regional Police - Tactical and Rescue Unit
Service de police de la Ville de Québec - Groupe Tactique d'intervention
Regina Police Service - Special Weapons and Tactics (SWAT) Team
Royal Newfoundland Constabulary - Tactics and Rescue Unit (TRU)
 Saskatoon Police Service - Tactical Support Unit (TSU)
Saint John Police Force & Kennebecasis Regional Police Force - Emergency Tactical Services (ETS)
South Simcoe Police Service - Containment Team/Emergency Response Unit (ERU)
Stratford Police Services - Emergency Response Unit (ERU)
 Sûreté du Québec - Groupe d'intervention tactique
Thunder Bay Police Service - Emergency Task Unit (ETU)
 Toronto Police Service - Emergency Task Force (ETF)
 Vancouver Police Department - Emergency Response Team (ERT)
Victoria Police Department & Saanich Police Department - Greater Victoria Emergency Response Team
Waterloo Regional Police Service - Special Response Unit
 Windsor Police Service - Tactical Unit
 Winnipeg Police Service - Tactical Support Team (TST)
Woodstock Police Service - Containment Team
York Regional Police - Emergency Response Unit (ERU)
 Atlona Police Service, Morden Police Service & Winkler Police Service - Regional Support Tactical Team
Other units
 Atomic Energy of Canada Limited (AECL) - Nuclear Security Response Team
 Bruce Power - Nuclear Response Team (NRT)
 Canadian Nuclear Laboratories - Nuclear Response Force (NRF)
 NB Power - Nuclear Response Team (NRT)
 Ontario Power Generation - Nuclear Security

Chile
Carabineros de Chile

Grupo de Operaciones Policiales Especiales (GOPE; 'Police Special Operations Group')

Chilean Investigation Police (Policía de Investigaciones de Chile)

Equipo de Reacción Táctica Antinarcóticos (ERTA; 'Antinarcotics Tactical Response Team')

Gendarmería de Chile (Prison Service)Sección de Operaciones Tácticas (SOT; 'Tactical Operations Section')

China
Ministry of Public Security of the People's Republic of China
 Beijing SWAT
 Shanghai SWAT

People's Armed Police
 Snow Leopard Commando Unit (SWCU)
 Immediate Action Unit (IAU)
 Special Police Unit (SPU)

Colombia
 National Police of Colombia 
 LOBOS (Wolves)
 (COPES) Comandos de Operaciones Especiales (Special Operations Commandos)
 (JUNGLA) Jungle
 (GOES) Grupo de Operaciones Especiales (Special operations group) (SWAT equivalent)
 GAULA Units (Hostage rescue)

Croatia
 Special Police
 Lučko Anti-Terrorist Unit (ATJ Lučko)
 Special Police Units  (SJP Split "BATT", SJP Rijeka "AJKULA", SJP Osijek "ORAO")
 Riot Police Units- EPZ (Ekipa za Posebne Zadaće) tactical platoon within Intervention/riot police

Cyprus
Cyprus Police
Emergency Response Unit (MMAD)

Czech Republic
 Police of the Czech Republic
 Útvar rychlého nasazení [ÚRN/URNA] Rapid Reaction Unit, national police CT unit
Krajská zásahová jednotka - [KZJ] 8 regional police intervention units
 Celní správa České republiky
Skupina operativního nasazení - [SON]

Denmark
Rigspolitiet

 Politiets Aktionsstyrke (Special Intervention Unit)

Københavns Politi (Copenhagen Police Department)
Udrykningssektionen (First Response Unit)

Ecuador
 GOE - Grupo de Operaciones Especiales (Police)
 GIR - Grupo de Intervención y Rescate (Police)

Egypt
Egyptian National Police
 Unit 333 (Special unit of the interior ministry)
 Black Cobra (Counter terrorism special unit)

Estonia
Estonian Police
 K-Commando (Special unit of the Central Crime Police)

Fiji

 Police National Operations Support UnitNew life for elite police unit

Finland
Police of Finland
 Police Rapid Response Unit
Finnish Border Guard
 Border Guard Special Intervention Unit

France
National Police
 Recherche Assistance Intervention Dissuasion (RAID). RAID is composed of a central unit based in Bièvres (near Paris) and 13 regional branches named Antennes du RAID. The 13 Regional branches are located in metropolitan and overseas France and were formerly known as GIPNs.
Brigade anticommando (BRI-BAC). The Paris Police Prefecture (PP) anti-terrorism task force. It is activated in emergency situations. BRI-BAC is primarily composed of personnel from the Paris Police Prefecture Brigade de recherche et d'intervention (BRI-PP) (from the Judiciary Police directorate) with reinforcements from other PP units. Although the official name of the unit when activated is Brigade anticommando, it is often simply referred to by the press as BRI (which can be confusing as there are BRIs in each region of France).

In an emergency situation, BRI-BAC and RAID can also form a task-force called FIPN (Force d'intervention de la Police nationale), under the command of the RAID commander.

Gendarmerie
 Groupe d'Intervention de la Gendarmerie Nationale (GIGN; "National Gendarmerie Intervention Group"). GIGN is composed of a central unit based in Versailles-Satory, near Paris and 14 regional branches based in metropolitan and overseas France which are known as Antennes du GIGN (AGIGN).
Pelotons spécialisé de protection de la Gendarmerie (PSPG). 20 units primarily dedicated to protecting the French civilian nuclear sites. Can be engaged as tactical units in a secondary role.

Helicopter support for GIGN and RAID
 Groupe interarmées d'hélicoptères (GIH). A joint army/air force helicopter unit belonging to COS (Commandement des opérations spéciales : Special operations command). Its primary role is support of GIGN and RAID.

 Ministry of Justice
 (Regional Intervention and Security Team). Unit under the command of the carceral administration, formed partially by the GIGN, to intervene inside prison in case of particular events (riots, mutiny, evasion, terrorism).

Ghana
Ghana Police Service
National SWAT Unit

GeorgiaState Security Service of GeorgiaCounterterrorist Center
Special Operations CenterMinistry of Internal Affairs of GeorgiaCounter Intelligence Department
Special Emergency and Situations Management Center
Central Anti Crime Department
Regional Special Task DivisionsSpecial State Protection Service (SSPS) 

Tactical Response Group

Germany
Federal
Bundespolizei (Federal Police)
Grenzschutzgruppe 9 der Bundespolizei (GSG 9) - Special Operations and Counterterrorism unit
Beweissicherungs- und Festnahmeeinheit (BFE) - Special Detention Unit of Federal Anti Riot Police
Beweissicherungs- und Festnahmeeinheit plus (BFE+) - Special Counter-Terrorism Unit of Federal Anti Riot Police
Polizeiliche Schutzaufgaben Ausland der Bundespolizei - Police protection unit of German Diplomatic Missions
Bundeskriminalamt (Federal Criminal/Investigation Police)
Mobiles Einsatzkommando (MEK) - Tactical Unit, but also handles surveillance, observation and arrests
Auslands- und Spezialeinsätze (ASE) - Close protection unit for high-threat environments
Zollkriminalamt (Customs Investigation Bureau)
Zentrale Unterstützungsgruppe Zoll (ZUZ) - Customs Tactical Unit
Feldjäger (Military Police)
Zugriffskräfte ('Special Tactics and Apprehension Unit')
State
Landespolizei (State Police)
Spezialeinsatzkommando (SEK) - State Tactical Unit, Part of Uniformed Police
Beweissicherungs- und Festnahmeeinheit  (BFE) - Special Detention Unit, Part of State Anti Riot Police
Mobiles Einsatzkommando (MEK) - Tactical and Surveillance Unit, Part of Criminal Police

Greece
Greek Police
 Special Anti-Terrorist Unit (EKAM)
Greek Coast Guard
 Special Operations Teams (OEA)

Haiti
 Haitian National Police
 Le Groupe d'Intervention de la Police Nationale d'Haïti (GIPNH) - National Police Intervention Group

Hong Kong
 Hong Kong Police Force 
 Airport District
 Airport Security Unit (ASU)
 Police Tactical Unit Headquarters
 Special Duties Unit (SDU)
 Special Tactical Contingent (STC)
 Counter-Terrorism and Internal Security Division
 Counter-Terrorism Response Unit (CTRU)
 Crime Wing
 Operation Support Unit (aka Hit Team)
 Railway District
 Railway Response Team (RRT)
Security Wing
VIP Protection Unit (VIPPU)
Witness Protection Unit (WPU)
Marine Police
 Maritime Emergency Response Team (MERT)
 Hong Kong Correctional Services
 Correctional Emergency Response Team (CERT)
 Regional Response Team (RRT)

Hungary
 Counter Terrorism Centre (TEK - Terrorelhárítási Központ)
 Készenléti Rendőrség (Operational Police)

Iceland
Icelandic Police
 Víkingasveitin ('Viking Squad') - Special Operations Unit of the National Commissioner

India
Law Enforcement in India
 National Security Guard
 Special Action Group (SAG) - the main offensive or the strike wing of the NSG
 51 Special Action Group - counter-terrorism operations
 52 Special Action Group - counter-hijack operations
 Special Ranger Group (SRG) - provides logistical support to the SAGs during operations
 11 Special Ranger Group
 12 Special Ranger Group
 13 Special Ranger Group
 Special Composite Group (SCG) - conduct regional counter terror operations
 26 Special Composite Group in Mumbai
 27 Special Composite Group in Chennai
 28 Special Composite Group in Hyderabad
 29 Special Composite Group in Kolkata
 30 Special Composite Group in Gandhinagar
 Border Security Force (BSF)
 Creek Crocodile Commando
 Railway Protection Force 
 Commandos for Railway Safety (CORAS)
 Anti-Terrorism Squad
 Andhra Pradesh Police
 Organisation for Counter Terrorist Operations
 Jammu and Kashmir Police
 Special Operation Group (SOG)
 Gujarat Police
 Chetak Commandos
 Odisha Police
 Special Operation Group (Odisha Police)
 Special Tactical Unit - Urban counter-terrorist unit of the parent force
 Maharashtra Police 
 C-60 Commando force
 Mumbai Police
 Force One - specialized in counter-terrorism
 Central Reserve Police Force
 Commando Battalion for Resolute Action (COBRA) - Special operation force of the CRPF
 Rapid Action Force - A specialized wing of CRPF
 West Bengal Police
 Counter Insurgency Force - Counter insurgency & Counter terrorism unit of West Bengal Police
 Greyhounds - Police special force unit operating in the Indian States of Andhra Pradesh and Telangana for anti-insurgency operations
 Punjab Police SWAT Team
 Kerala Police
 Kerala Thunderbolts
Protective Service Unit
 Special Protection Group
 SWAT teams of States like Punjab, Delhi & Jammu & Kashmir

IndonesiaIndonesian National Police (POLRI) 
Mobile Brigade Corps (Indonesian: Korps Brigade Mobil) abbreviated as BrimobGegana is a detachment from Brimob which specializes in bomb disposal, counter-terrorism, CBR defense and intelligence operations.
Detachment 88, known locally as (Densus 88) is the special counter-terrorism unit of the Indonesian National Police.

Directorate General of Customs and Excise (Bea Cukai)
"Customs Tactical Unit" also known as "CTU" is the special unit of the Indonesian Customs

Maritime Security Agency (Bakamla)
"Maritime Rapid Reaction Unit" (Unit Reaksi Cepat Laut) abbreviated as URCL.

Iran
Iranian Police
Iranian Police Special Units
Counter-terrorism Special Force

Iraq
Iraqi Police
 Hilla SWAT Team
Golden counterterrorism squad
 Special Police Commandos

Ireland
Garda Síochána (National Police)
 Emergency Response Unit (ERU)
 Armed Support Unit (ASU)

Israel
Israel Police
Yasam
Gidonim

Israel Border Police
Yamam

Yamas
Israel Prison Service
Nachshon
Dror
Metzada

Italy
Carabinieri (National Gendarmerie)
 Gruppo di Intervento Speciale (GIS)
 Raggruppamento Operativo Speciale (ROS)
Polizia di Stato (National Civil Police)
 Nucleo Operativo Centrale di Sicurezza (NOCS)
 Servizio Centrale Operativo (SCO)
Italian Penitentiary Police
 Gruppo Operativo Mobile (GOM)
Italian Finance Security
 Antiterrorismo Pronto Impiego (AT-PI)
 Gruppo di investigazione criminalità organizzata (GICO)

Japan
 Security Bureaus of Prefectural police headquarters (supervised by the National Police Agency Security Bureau)
 Special Assault Team (SAT) - national-level counter-terrorism units
 Anti-firearms squads - territorial-level counter-terrorism units
 Criminal Investigation Bureaus of Prefectural police headquarters
 Special Investigation Team (SIT) - Akita/Iwate/Ibaraki/Miyagi/Fukushima/Tochigi/Tokyo/Shizuoka/Aichi/Mie/Fukuoka/Nagasaki 
 Martial Arts Attack Team (MAAT) - Osaka
 Assault Response Team - Chiba
 Special Tactical Section - Saitama
 Special Investigation Section - Kanagawa
 Technical Special Team - Aomori
 Hostage Rescue Team - Hiroshima
Japan Coast Guard
 Special Security Team (SST) - national-level maritime counter-terrorism teams
  - regional-level riot control and special reaction teams

Jordan
General Directorate Of Gendarmerie
 Unit 14

GID
 GID Special Unit

Kenya
General Service Unit (Kenya)

Kosovo
 NJSI - Special Intervention Unit 
 NJSO - Special Operation Unit 
 NJRSH - Rapid Response Unit

Kuwait
 Kuwait Special Force (Al Quwat Al Khasa)
 Kuwait Swat team

Latvia
State Police of Latvia
 Special Tasks Battalion former as Special Tasks Battalion "ALFA"
 Counter-terrorist unit "OMEGA" (")

Lebanon
Lebanese Internal Security Forces Directorate
Black Panthers (Al Fouhoud) - Special Operations Unit

Information Branch - Intelligence Unit

Liechtenstein
 Landespolizei
 Intervention Unit

Lithuania

Police Department
 ARAS - Lithuanian Police Anti-terrorist Operations Unit
 Mobile Squads - Lithuanian Public Police Tactical Support, Riot Control, and Crimesupression units

State Border Guard Service
 SPS "Perkūnas" - Special Purpose Unit "Perkunas" former as Special Purpose Squad (VSAT SPB)

Public Security Service
 ORKA - Operative Reaction Counterattack Squad

Dignitary Protection Service 
 Tactical Support Unit -

Luxembourg
 Grand Ducal Police
 Unité Spéciale de la Police

Macau
Public Security Police Force of Macau
Police Tactical Intervention Unit
 Special Operations Team (GOE)
Correctional Services Bureau
Tactical Response Unit

Republic of Macedonia
 Macedonian Police
 Special Anti-Terrorism Unit - "Tigers" (Специјална Антитерористичка Единица —Тигар)
 Unit for fast deployment (Единица за Брзо Распоредување)

Malaysia

Royal Malaysia Police

Pasukan Gerakan Khas (PGK; 'Special Operation Command')
69 Commando Battalion (VAT 69) - Police special forces unit that specialised in jungle warfare. Some also trained as a counter-terrorism unit.
Special Actions Unit - Police special forces unit that specialised in counter-terrorism in the urban area and big cities. Some also assigned as close-protection to the top government executives.
General Operations Force
 Tiger Platoon - Paramilitary police front-line special combat unit
Marine Operations Force
Marine Assault Team (MAST) - Marine police counter-terrorism unit

Malaysia Coast Guard

 Special Task and Rescue (STAR) - Coast Guard's counter-terrorism unit

Other federal government agencies

 Trup Tindakan Cepat (TTC) - Prison's SWAT team
 Pasukan Taktikal Khas (PASTAK) - Immigration's SWAT team
Customs Operational Battle Force Response Assault (COBRA) - Customs' SWAT team

Malta
Maltese Police
 Rapid Intervention Unit (RIU) and Special Intervention Unit (SIU)

Mexico
Policia Federal
 Grupo de Operaciones Especiales (GOPES)
 Fuerzas Federales de Apoyo
 Proteccion Federal
 Policia Federal de Caminos
 Division de Inteligencia

Mongolia
Mongolian Police
 Special Response Unit
 SWAT

Morocco
Royal Gendarmerie

Groupe d'intervention de la Gendarmerie royale (G.I.G.R)

National Police

Bureau central des investigations judiciaire (B.C.I.J)

Myanmar
Myanmar Police Force
Special Weapons and Tactics (S.W.A.T)

Namibia
Namibian Police Force
 Special Reserve Force (SRF)

Netherlands
Nationale Politie (National Police)
 Dienst Speciale Interventies (Special Intervention Service) - Collection of joint, on-call or part-time basis SWAT teams recruiting from police, military police and army (but falling under civilian police command). The Service consists of four Units:
Aanhoudings- en Ondersteuningsteams (Arrest and Support Teams) - High-risk arrests, protection of undercover police officers and secret agents and supporting investigation work.
Unit Interventie (Intervention Unit) - Small-scale high-risk operations, deployed in situations involving heavy firearms, explosions, hazardous substances and/or suicidal gunmen.
M-Squadron (Marine Intervention Unit), also known by the name of its main component, NLMARSOF - Large-scale counter-terrorism operations. Capable of land, air, amphibious, marine and submarine operations and responsible for operations in large aircraft and buildings and installations at sea. Called in when the Unit Interventie can no longer handle the situation, which makes it the ultimate special law enforcement unit of the Netherlands.
Unit Expertise en Operationele Ondersteuning (Expertise and Operational Support Unit) - Sniper teams. Police and army each provide one half of the snipers.
Dienst Bewaken & Beveiliging (Guard & Security Service) - VIP security, most notably the royal family, politicians and diplomats.
Mobiele Eenheid (ME) (Mobile Unit) - Part-time non-lethal riot police. When not deployed, officers serve as regular police.
Koninklijke Landmacht (Royal Army)
Korps Commandotroepen (KCT) - Responsible for counter-terrorism and special operations in foreign countries.
Koninklijke Marechaussee (Royal Military Constabulary)
 Brigade Speciale Beveiligingsopdrachten (Special Protection Tasks Brigade) - Very high-risk arrests, infiltration and VIP security. Unlike the secret agents of the AIVD, its undercover police officers are allowed to carry weapons.
Bijstandseenheid (Support Unit) - Various SWAT duties and, most notably, serving as heavy riot police and internal security force cleared to use lethal force if necessary to restore public order.
Dienst Justitionele Inrichtingen (Custodial Institutions Agency)
Intern Bijstand Team (Internal Support Team) - Low-risk prison riot squads and backup teams for regular prison officers, available around the clock at every institution
Dienst Vervoer en Ondersteuning (Transport and Support Service) - In addition to the offices and training facilities of the Agency, also consists out of:
Landelijke Bijzondere Bijstandseenheid (National Special Support Unit) - High-risk prison riot, shakedown and evacuation unit. Also includes canine units and escorts for when prisoners have to go to hospitals.
Bijzonder Ondersteunings Team (BOT) (Special Support Team) - High-risk prisoner transport.

New Zealand
New Zealand Police
 Armed Offenders Squad (AOS), incidents involving weapons
 Special Tactics Group (STG), counter terrorist

Nicaragua 
Policia Nacional-DOEP
 Tácticas y Armas Policiales de Intervención y Rescate (TAPIR)
 Departamento de Intervención Rápida (GIR)

Nigeria
Nigeria Police Force
 Anti-Terrorism Squad (ATS) - counter terrorist unit
 Rapid Response Squad (RRS)
 Criminals Investigation Department (CID)
 Special Anti-Cultism Squad (SACS)
 Anti-Riot Squad
 Nigerian Mobile Police Force
 Anti-Bomb Squad.

State Security Service (Nigeria)
 Department of State Security (DSS), VIP protection/counter terrorist

Norway
Norwegian Police Service 
 Delta
 Utrykningsenheten (UEH)

Pakistan
 Federal agencies
 Federal Investigation Agency — Counter-terrorism Wing (CTW)

 Provincial agencies
 Punjab Police — Elite Police & Dolphin Force
 Sindh Police — Special Security Unit
 Khyber Pakhtunkhwa Police — Special Combat Unit

Panama
 Darien-Kuna Yala Border Security Police (DARKUN)

Peru

National Police of Peru
Tactical Action Sub-Unit - (Sub-Unidad de Acción Táctica) SUAT
Sinchis

Philippines
 Philippine National Police
 Special Action Force
 SWAT
Regional Mobile Force Battalions (RMFB) in each Regional Police Offices.
District Mobile Force Battalions (DMFB) in each Police District under the National Capital Region Police Office.
Provincial Mobile Force Companies (PMFC) in each Provincial Police Office.
City Mobile Force Companies (CMFC) in City Police Offices in Major cities outside Metro Manila.

Poland
 ABW
 BOR
Policja

 BOA
Centralne Biuro Śledcze Policji (CBŚP)
 Samodzielny Pododdział Antyterrorystyczny Policji (SPAP)
 Straż Graniczna (SG)

Portugal
Public Security Police
 Special Police Unit (UEP)
 Intervention Corps - riot control unit
 Special Operations Group (GOE) - special tactical assault unit
 Personal Security Corps - VIP protection unit
 Center for Explosive Disposal and Subsoil Security (CIESS) - EOD and subsoil security unit
 Cino-technical Operational Group - K9 unit
National Republican Guard
 Intervention Unit (UI)
 Special Operations Intervention Group (GIOE) - special tactical assault unit
 Public Order Intervention Group (GIOP) - riot control unit
 Protection and Rescue Intervention Group (GIPS) - Rescue and firefighting unit
 Center for Explosive Disposal and Subsoil Security (CIESS) - EOD and subsoil security unit
 Cino-technical Intervention Group (GIC) - K9 unit

Prison Guard

 Cino-technical Operational Group - K9 unit
 Intervention and Prison Security Group (GISP) - tactical intervention unit

Maritime Police

 Tactical Actions Group (GAT) - special boarding unit
 Forensic Diving Group - underwater forensic investigation unit

Romania
Ministry of Interior and Administrative Reform
 Special Group for Protection and Intervention (GSPI) - disbanded
Police
 Detașamentul de Poliție pentru Intervenție Rapidă
 SAS - the service for special actions
SIIAS Serviciul Independent pentru Intervenții și Acțiuni Speciale (Independent Special Actions and Intervention Service)
Romanian Gendarmerie
 BSIJ Special Intervention Brigade "Vlad Țepeș"
Romanian Secret Service (SRI)
 BAT - Anti-Terror Brigade

Russia

Center of Special Operations of the FSB
 Directorate "A" (Spetsgruppa Alpha)
 Directorate "V" (Spetsgruppa Vympel)
 Directorate "S" (Spetsgruppa Smerch)
 Directorate "K" (Kavkaz - formerly Special Purpose unit for the city of Yessentuki)
 Directorate "T" (Spetsgruppa Tavrida) (Crimea, previously - 2nd service "SN" of FSB)
 Special Arms Service

Foreign Intelligence Service
 Special Operations Department of Directorate Z (Zaslon)

 Ministry of Internal Affairs
OSN "Grom" for Counter-Drugs operations (formerly it was subordinated to the defunct Federal Drug Control Service of Russia)

National Guard of Russia
Special Purpose Mobile Unit (O.M.O.N.)
Special Rapid Response Units (S.O.B.R.)

Ministry of Justice
Dozens of various independent detachments, such as OSN Saturn.

Federal Penitentiary Service OSNs:
OSN "Fakel"
OSN "Rossy"
OSN "Akula"
OSN "Ajsberg"
OSN "Gurza"
OSN "Korsar"
OSN "Rosomaha"
OSN "Sokol"
OSN "Saturn"
OSN "Tornado"
OSN "Kondor"
OSN "Yastreb"
OSN "Berkut"
OSN "Grif"
OSN "Titan"
OSN "Gepard"

Singapore
Singapore Police Force
 Emergency Response Team (ERT)
 Special Operations Command (SOC)
 Rapid Deployment Troops
 Police Tactical Unit (PTU)
 Special Tactics and Rescue (STAR)
 Special Guard and Counter-Terrorism Unit (GC)
 Special Action Group (GC)
 Special Tactical Unit (GC)
 In-Situ Reaction Team (ProCom)
 Counter Assault Unit

Singapore Prison Service
 Singapore Prisons Emergency Action Response (SPEAR)

Police Coast Guard
 Special Task Squadron (STS)
 Emergency Response Force

Slovenia
 Specialna Enota Policije (SEP) - the principle counter-terrorist & hostage rescue unit,
 Posebna Policijska Enota (PPE) - the principle public order & peace enforcement unit.

Serbia

 Special Anti-Terrorist Unit
 Gendarmery

Slovakia
 Útvar Osobitného Určenia (UOU) Lynx commando - Special Designation Unit of the Presidium of Police

South Africa 
South African Police Service
 Special Task Force (STF)
 National Intervention Unit (NIU) - This Unit of the South African Police Service respond to incidents of medium to high risk.
Tactical Response Team (TRT) a part of the South African Police Response services, respond to incidents medium to high risk situations. Tasked with follow up operations, battle craft rural and urban operations, support at ports of entry, cluster operations, land borne operations overt & covert ops.
Most of its members are now part of the parliamentary security team.
They also provide escorts of dangerous prisoners.
 South African Police Service Riot Squad/Anti-Riot Squad/ Public Order Policing/Internal Stability Unit (POP/ISU)
Its members are highly trained in advance crowd control both French & Belgium tactics, medium to high risk operations

South Korea
Korean National Police Agency
SOU(Special Operation Unit)
Seoul Metropolitan Police SOU
Gyeonggi Nambu Provincial Police Agency SOU
Gyeonggi Bukbu Police Agency SOU
Incheon Metropolitan Police SOU
Busan Metropolitan Police SOU
Daegu Metropolitan Police SOU
Gyeongbuk Provincial Police SOU
Gyeongnam Provincial Police Agency SOU
Daejeon Metropolitan Police SOU
Chungnam Provincial Police SOU
Sejong City Police SOU
Gwangju Metropolitan Police Agency SOU
Jeonbuk Provincial Police SOU
Jeonnam Provincial Police SOU
Jeju Provincial Police SOU

Republic of Korea Coast Guard
SSAT(Sea Special Attack Team)
KOREA COAST GUARD REGION-CENTRAL SSAT
KOREA COAST GUARD REGION-EAST SSAT
KOREA COAST GUARD REGION-WEST SSAT
KOREA COAST GUARD REGION-SOUTH SSAT
KOREA COAST GUARD REGION-JEJU SSAT

Presidential Security Service
CAT(Counter Assault Team)

ROK Military Police (MP)
SDT(Special Duty Team)

Spain
Guardia Civil (Spanish gendarmerie)

 Unidad Especial de Intervención (UEI, Special Intervention Unit) - "Tier 1" special forces unit for counter-terrorism and hostage rescue among other critical tasks.
 Grupo de Acción Rápida (GAR, Rapid Action Group) - "Tier 2" special forces unit formerly focused on counter-terrorism in rural areas, now multipurpose.

National Police Corps of Spain

 Grupo Especial de Operaciones (GEO, Special Operations Group) - "Tier 1" special forces unit for counter-terrorism and hostage rescue among other critical tasks.
 Grupos Operativos Especiales de Seguridad (GOES, Special Operative Security Groups) - smaller SWAT-like teams throughout Spain.

Mossos d'Esquadra (Catalonian regional police)

 Grup Especial d'Intervenció (GEI, Special Intervention Group) - Catalonian regional special unit similar to UEI and GEO.

Ertzaintza (Basque regional police)

 Berrozi Berezi Taldea (BBT, Special Intervention Group) - Basque regional special unit similar to UEI and GEO.

 Policía Foral (Navarrese regional police)

Grupo de Intervención Especial (GIE, Special Intervention Group) - Navarrese regional special unit similar to UEI and GEO.

Sri Lanka
Sri Lanka Police Service
 Special Task Force (STF)

Sweden
Swedish Police Authority
 National Task Force (Nationella insatsstyrkan)
 Reinforced Regional Task Force (Förstärkt Regional Insatsstyrka)
Reinforced Regional Task Force Stockholm (Förstärk Regional Insatsstyrka Stockholm)
Reinforced Regional Task Force South (Förstärkt Regional Insatsstyrka Syd)
Reinforced Regional Task Force West (Förstärkt Regional Insatsstyrka Väst)
Regional Task Force (Regional Insatsstyrka)
Regional Task Force East
Regional Task Force Bergslagen
Regional Task Force Middle
Regional Task Force North

Switzerland

Federal Office of Police (FedPol) 
Einsatzgruppe TIGRIS

Cantonal (states) police 
Basel-campaign State Police
Interventionseinheit Barracuda
Bern State Police
Einsatzgruppe Enzian
Central Switzerland Police
Interventionseinheit Lynx
Fribourg State Police
Groupe d'intervention de la police cantonale fribourgeoise (GRIF)
Geneva State Police 
Groupe d'intervention de la police cantonale (GRIC/GI)
Jura State Police
Groupe d'intervention et Tireurs d'Elite (GITE)
Neuchatel State Police
GI COUGAR
Ticino State Police
Reparti Speciali-Gruppo d'Intervento (ReS-GI)
Valais State Police
Groupe d'intervention "Edelweiss" (GI Edelweiss)
Vaud State Police
Détachement d'Action Rapide et de Dissuasion (DARD)
Zürich State Police
Einsatzgruppe Diamant
Interventionseinheit Skorpion

Taiwan 
National Police Agency (NPA)
 National Police Agency Special Operations Group
 Criminal Investigation Bureau Special Task Unit
 Special Police Corps
 Wei-An Special Services Commando
 Thunder Squad (Special Weapons And Tactics Police Counter-Terrorism unit)
Coast Guard Administration
 Special Task Unit

Thailand
Royal Thai Police
 Royal Thai Police Arintaraj 26 Special Operations Unit
 Royal Thai Police Black Tiger Special Operations Unit
 Royal Thai Police Burapa 491 Special Operations Unit
 Royal Thai Police Counter Terrorism Special Operations Unit
 Royal Thai Police Danthai 54 Special Operations Unit
 Royal Thai Police Eagle 7 Special Operations Unit
 Royal Thai Police Hanuman Special Operations Unit
 Royal Thai Police Kumhang-Songkram Special Operations Unit
 Royal Thai Police Long Range Surveillance Unit (LRSU)
 Royal Thai Police Narcotics Suppression Bureau Commando (NSB Commando)
 Royal Thai Police Naresuan 261 Special Operation Unit
 Royal Thai Police Pali 63 Special Operations Unit
 Royal Thai Police Rajadej Special Operations Unit
 Royal Thai Police Siharaj 65 Special Operations Unit
 Royal Thai Police Thotsarot 491 Special Operations Unit
 Royal Thai Police Yakkharajh 49 Special Operations Unit

 Independent agencies
 Court of Justice (COJ)
 Office of Security (OOS)
 Fugitive Unit (FU)

Ministry 
 Ministry of Finance (MOF)
 Customs Department (CD)
 Special Operations Unit (SOU)

 Ministry of Interior (MOI)
 Department of Provincial Administration (DOPA)
 Department of Provincial Administration Special Wisdom And Tactics (DOPA S.W.A.T.)

 Ministry of Justice (MOJ)
 Department of Corrections (DC)
 Special Operations Section (SOS)
 Department of Special Investigation (DSI)
 Bureau of Special Operation (BSO)
 Office of the Narcotics Control Board (ONCB)
 Eagle 19 Special Operations Team (Eagle 19 SOT)

 Ministry of Natural Resources and Environment (MNRE)
 Royal Forest Department (RFD)
 Naam Peung 62 Special Operations Unit (Naam Peung 62 SOU)
 Small Ranger Unit (SRU)

 Office of the Prime Minister (OPM)
National Intelligence Agency (NIA)
Special Operations Division (SOD)

Turkey
General Directorate of Security
 Police Special Operation Department
 Police Counter Attack Team

Turkish Gendarmerie
 Gendarmerie Special Public Security Command
 Gendarmerie Special Operations

United Arab Emirates
Dubai Police Force
 Police Special Unit

United Kingdom
Firearms unit (with SFO or CTSFO)

National
British Transport Police Firearms 
Dynamic Search Team (DS)
Interdiction Team (IT)
Strategic Escort Group (SEG)
Ministry of Defence Police Tactical Support Group

Territorial police forces
Avon & Somerset Constabulary Firearms unit and Dog unit
Cambridgeshire Constabulary Tactical Firearms Unit
City of London Police Tactical Firearms Group
Cleveland Police Specialist Operations Unit
Devon and Cornwall Constabulary Tactical Aid Group
Dorset Police Tactical Firearms Unit
Durham Constabulary Specialist Operations Unit
Greater Manchester Police Tactical Firearms Unit
Kent Police Training and Tactical Firearms Unit
Hampshire Constabulary Tactical Firearms Support Unit
Metropolitan Police Service Specialist Firearms Command and Territorial Support Group
Norfolk Constabulary Firearms Training & Operations Unit
North Yorkshire Police Firearms Support Unit
Police Service of Northern Ireland Headquarters Mobile Support Unit
Police Scotland Specialist Firearms Unit
South Wales Police, Gwent police & Dyfed-Powes Police Joint Firearms Unit
Suffolk Constabulary Tactical Firearms Unit
Surrey Police Tactical Firearms Unit
Sussex Police Tactical Firearms Unit
Staffordshire Police Central Firearms Unit
Thames Valley Police Tactical Firearms Team
West Midlands Police  Firearms Operations Unit
Wiltshire Police Armed Response Group

United States
Federal Law Enforcement Agencies
The federal law enforcement agencies in the United States have tactical units.
 U.S. Department of Energy
 Special Response Force (SRF)
 United States Department of Defense
 Special Reaction Teams (SRT) - United States Army Military Police Corps, Master-at-arms (United States Navy), United States Air Force Security Forces and United States Marine Corps Military Police have tactical units.
 U.S. Department of Homeland Security
 Customs and Border Protection (CBP)
 Office of Field Operations (OFO) 
 Special Response Teams (SRT)
 Quick Reaction Force (QRF) - CBP National Capital Region based tactical team 
 U.S. Border Patrol 
 Special Operations Group
 Border Patrol Tactical Unit (BORTAC)
 Sector BORTAC
 Border Patrol, Search, Trauma and Rescue (BORSTAR)
 Federal Protective Service (FPS) - Rapid Protection Force (RPF)
 Immigration and Customs Enforcement (ICE)
 Homeland Security Investigations (HSI) - Special Response Teams (SRT)
 Homeland Security Investigations (HSI) - Rapid Response Team (RRT)
 Enforcement and Removal Operations (ERO)
 Special Response Teams (SRT)
 U.S. Coast Guard
Deployable Specialized Forces (DSF)
 Tactical Law Enforcement Teams (TACLET)
 Helicopter Interdiction Tactical Squadron (HITRON)
 Vessel Boarding Security Teams (VBST)
 U.S. Secret Service
 Counter Sniper (CS) Unit
 U.S. Secret Service Uniform Division (UD) - Emergency Response Team (ERT)
 U.S. Secret Service - Counter Assault Team (CAT)
 United States Department of Justice
 Bureau of Alcohol, Tobacco, Firearms, and Explosives (ATF) - Special Response Teams (SRT)
 Drug Enforcement Administration (DEA)
Foreign Deployed Advisory Support Team (FAST)
 DEA Special Response Teams (SRT)
 Federal Bureau of Investigation (FBI) 
Critical Incident Response Group (CIRG)
 Hostage Rescue Team (HRT) 
 Crisis Negotiation Unit (CNU)
 Special Weapons and Tactics Teams (FBI SWAT) 
 Tactical Helicopter Unit (THU)
 Federal Bureau of Prisons - Special Operations Response Team (SORT)
 U.S. Marshals Service (USMS)
 USMS Special Operations Group (SOG)
 USMS - Special Response Teams (SRT)
 U.S. Department of State
 Diplomatic Security Service - Office of Mobile Security Deployments (MSD)
 U.S. Department of the Treasury
U.S. Mint Police - Special Response Teams (SRT)
 National Park Service
 Special Response Teams (SRT)
 Grand Canyon Special Response Team 
 Yellowstone Special Response Team 
 Western Region Special Response Team 
 Special Event and Tactical Teams (SETT)
 Midwest Special Event and Tactical Team
 Pacific West Region Special Event and Tactical Team
 Southeast Region Special Event and Tactical Team
 Blue Ridge North Carolina Tactical Tracking Team
 U.S. Park Police Special Weapons and Tactics Team
 United States Park Police, New York Field Office Special Weapons and Tactics (SWAT) Unit

Independent Federal Agencies
 Amtrak Police - Special Operations Unit (SOU)
 Central Intelligence Agency (CIA) - Security Protective Service (SPS) - Rapid Response Team (RRT)
 Federal Reserve Police - Special Response Team (SRT)
 National Security Agency Police (NSAP) - Emergency Response Team (ERT)
 Pentagon Force Protection Agency
 Pentagon Police Directorate - Emergency Response Team (ERT)
 U.S. Capitol Police - Containment Emergency Response Team (CERT)

State Police/Highway Patrol Agencies
The state police (state troopers) and highway patrols of the United States have tactical units.
 Alabama Police Departments,County Sheriff's Department or Office and DPS 
(ASPD's,CSODO's,DPS) - Special Emergency Response S.W.A.T Team (SERT)
 Arizona Department of Public Safety Special Weapons and Tactics (SWAT) Team
 California Highway Patrol - Special Weapons And Tactics (SWAT) Team
 California Department of Corrections and Rehabilitation 
 Crisis Response Teams (CRT)
 Special Service Unit (SSU)
 Colorado Department of Corrections Special Operations and Response Team (SORT)
 Connecticut Department of Correction Special Operations Group (SOG)
 Connecticut State Police - State Police Tactical Unit (SPTU)
 Delaware State Police - Special Operations Response Team (SORT)
 Florida Highway Patrol - Tactical Response Teams (TRT)
 Florida Department of Law Enforcement (FDLE) - Special Operations Teams (SOT)
 Florida Fish and Wildlife Conservation Commission - Special Operations Group (FWCSOG)
 Georgia Counter-Terrorism Task Force (CTTF) (State level multi-agency tactical team)
 Georgia State Patrol - Special Weapons and Tactics (SWAT) Team
 Hawaii Department of Public Safety Sheriff Division - Sheriff's Emergency Response Team (SERT)
 Idaho Department of Correction - Correctional Emergency Response Team (CERT)
 Illinois State Police - Tactical Response Team (TRT)
 Indiana State Police - Emergency Response Team (ERT)
 Kansas Highway Patrol - Special Response Team (SRT)
 Kentucky Department of Corrections - Corrections Emergency Response Team (CERT)
 Louisiana State Police - Special Weapons and Tactics (SWAT) Team
 Maine State Police - Tactical Team
 Maine Department of Corrections Special Operations Group
 Maryland Department of Natural Resources Police Special Operations Division, Tactical Response Team
 Maryland State Police
 Special Tactical Assault Team Element (STATE)
 Tactical Medical Unit (TMU)
 Maryland Transportation Authority Police - Special Response Team (SRT)
 Maryland Transit Administration Police - Visible Intermodal Prevention and Response (VIPR) Teams/Tactical Unit (formerly Special Response Team - SRT)
 Maryland Maritime Tactical Operations Group (MTOG) - Joint federal, state, and local tactical unit specializing in maritime tactical operations
 Massachusetts State Police  - Special Tactical Operations Team (STOP)
 Massachusetts Department of Correction Special Reaction Team (SRT)
 Michigan State Police  - Emergency Support Team (EST)
 Minnesota Department of Corrections Emergency Response Team (ERT)
 Minnesota State Patrol Special Response Team (SRT)
 Nebraska Department of Correctional Services Special Operations Response Team (SORT)
 New Hampshire Division of State Police - Special Weapons and Tactics (SWAT) Unit
 New Jersey State Police - Technical Emergency And Mission Specialists (TEAMS) 
 New Jersey Transit Police - Emergency Services Unit (ESU)
 New Jersey Transit Police - Conditions Tactical Unit (CTU)
 New Mexico State Police - Tactical Team
 New York State Police - Special Operations Response Teams (SORT)
 North Carolina State Bureau of Investigation (SBI) - Special Response Team (SRT)
 North Carolina Department of Correction Special Operations Response Team (SORT)
 Ohio State Highway Patrol - Special Response Team (SRT)
 Ohio Department of Rehabilitation and Corrections
 Special Response Teams (SRT)
 Special Tactics and Response (STAR)
 Oklahoma Highway Patrol Tactical Team
 Oklahoma Department of Corrections - Corrections Emergency Response Team (CERT)
 Oregon State Police - Special Weapons and Tactics (SWAT) Team
 Pennsylvania State Police - Special Emergency Response Team (SERT)
 Pennsylvania Department of Corrections 
 Corrections Rifle Specialist Team (CRST)
 Hostage Rescue Team (HRT)
Corrections Emergency Response Team (CERT)
 Port Authority Police Department (PAPD) – Emergency Services Unit (ESU)
 Rhode Island Department of Corrections Correctional Emergency Response Team (CERT) 
 Rhode Island State Police - Tactical Team, WMD Tactical Team
 South Carolina State Law Enforcement Division (SLED) - Special Weapons and Tactics (SWAT) Team
 Tennessee Highway Patrol - Special Operations Unit (SOU)
 Texas Department of Public Safety
 Ranger Division
 Ranger Recon Teams (RRT)
 Special Weapons and Tactics (SWAT) Team
 Texas Department of Public Safety - Special Response Teams (SRT)
 Texas Parks and Wildlife Department SCOUT Team (Tactical Response)
 Utah Highway Patrol - Special Emergency Response Team (SERT)
 Vermont State Police - Tactical Services Unit
 Virginia State Police - Special Weapons and Tactics Teams (SWAT)
 Virginia Department of Corrections - Tactical Support Unit (TSU)
 Washington State Patrol - Special Weapons and Tactics (SWAT)

Local Police/County Sheriff Agencies
The police departments and sheriff's offices of thousands of towns, cities, and counties across the United States have tactical units, which are usually called Special Weapons and Tactics (SWAT), Sheriff's Emergency Response Team, (SERT), or Emergency Response Team (ERT). Some examples are below.

 Anchorage Police Department Special Weapons And Tactics  (SWAT) team

 Denver Police Department - Special Weapons And Tactics (SWAT) Team
 Columbus Indiana Police Department -Special Weapons and Tactics Team (SWAT)

 Fairbanks Police Department Special weapons and tactics  (SWAT) team
 Miami Police Department - Special Threat Response: Special Weapons and Tactics Team (SWAT) and Hostage Negotiators
 Nassau County Police Department - Bureau of Special Operations (BSO), Emergency Service Unit (ESU)
 New York City Police Department - Emergency Service Unit (ESU), Critical Response Command (CRC) and Strategic Response Group (SRG)
 Las Vegas Metropolitan Police Department - Special Weapons and Tactics Team
Los Angeles Police Department Metropolitan Division - Special Weapons and Tactics (SWAT) Team
 Oakland Police Department - Special Weapons and Tactics (SWAT) Team
 Portland Police Bureau - Special Emergency Response Team (SERT)
 Tulsa County Sheriff's Office - Special Weapons And Tactics (SWAT) Team
 Greensboro Police Department - Special Response Team (SRT)
Hawaii County Police Department - Special Response Team (SRT)
Honolulu Police Department - Special Weapons and Tactics (SWAT)
Kauai County Police Department - Special Response Team (SRT)
Maui County Police Department - Special Response Team (SRT)
Raleigh Police Department - Selective Enforcement Unit (SEU)

Ukraine
Special Police Forces (Ukraine)
Security Service of Ukraine
 Alpha Group

National Guard of Ukraine
 18th Operational Regiment, Mariupol
 1st Patrol Battalion
 2nd Special Purpose Battalion "Donbas", Mariupol
 Special Purpose Regiment "Azov", Mariupol
 Special Patrol Company, Mariupol
"Scorpion" Special Forces Detachment, Kyiv, tasked with guarding Ukraine's nuclear industry
"Omega" Special Forces Anti-terrorism Detachment, Novi Petrivtsi
"Vega" Special Forces Detachment, Lviv
"Ares" Special Forces Intelligence Detachment, Kharkiv
"Odessa" Special Forces Detachment, Odessa

National Police of Ukraine
Rapid Operational Response Unit (KORD)

Special Tasks Patrol Police are the volunteer corps law enforcement units, part of the Ministry of Internal Affairs.
 Artemivsk Battalion
 Bogdan Battalion
 Chernihiv Battalion
 Dnipro-1 Regiment
 Donetsk-1 Battalion
 Donetsk-2 Battalion
 Ivano-Frankivsk Battalion
 Kharkiv Police Battalion
 Kherson Battalion
 Kirovohrad Battalion
 Kremenchuk Battalion
 Kryvbas Battalion
 Kyiv-1 Battalion
 Kyiv-2 Battalion
 Kyivshchyna Battalion
 Luhansk-1 Battalion
 Lviv Battalion
 Myrnyi Battalion
 Myrotvorets Battalion
 Poltava Battalion
 Shakhtarsk Battalion
 Shtorm Battalion
 Sich Battalion
 Sicheslav Battalion
 Skif Battalion
 Sumy Battalion
 Svityaz Battalion
 Svyatyi Mykolai Battalion
 Ternopil Battalion
 Ukraine Battalion
 Vinnytsia Battalion
 Zoloti Vorota Battalion

Venezuela
Policía Nacional Bolivariana
Unidad de Operaciones Tácticas Especiales (UOTE)

Vietnam
Vietnam People's Public Security

Vietnam Mobile Police (Cảnh sát cơ động) - Counter-terrorist and riot police

Bộ Tư lệnh Cảnh sát Cơ động K20 (K20 Police Headquarters)

Vietnam Rapid Response Police (Cảnh sát Phản ứng nhanh), also known as CS113 - Counter criminal police
Vietnam Special Criminal Investigation Police (Cảnh sát Hình sự Đặc nhiệm) - Investigation of special criminal cases

See also 

 List of commando units
 List of paratrooper forces
 List of military special forces units
 List of military diving units
 List of defunct special forces units
 List of reconnaissance units
 List of Special Reconnaissance organizations
 List of HALO/HAHO Jump capable units
 List of protective service agencies

 SWAT
 Field Force
 ATLAS Network

References

Law enforcement-related lists
-